Victory Park is a park in honor of the Great Patriotic War located in the mountainous part of Dushanbe in Tajikistan. The park was completed in 1985.

Overview 
Victory Park is a favorite vacation for citizens. On holidays, Victory Day parades are in the park such as in 2015 and 2017. During Navruz,  the park was decorated with 80,000 flowers of various types.

The area in general
Victory Park was opened in honor of the 40th anniversary of the Victory in the Great Patriotic War, however, the architectural and sculptural memorial complex was built in 1975. The central area is filled with an eternal flame, an alley of Heroes with high relief and sculpture Mother. At the foot of the stair is a granite slab with inscriptions in Tajik soldiers that were awarded the title of Hero of the Soviet Union.

Gallery

References

Buildings and structures in Dushanbe
Tajikistan
Parks in Tajikistan
Monuments and memorials in Tajikistan